This is a list of the Spanish Singles number-ones of 1976.

Chart history

See also
1976 in music
List of number-one hits (Spain)

References

1976
Spain Singles
Number-one singles